Princess Amalia of Sweden (Amalia Maria Charlotta; 22 February 180531 August 1853) was a Swedish princess, daughter of King Gustav IV Adolf of Sweden and Frederica of Baden.

Life
Amalia was born in Stockholm and raised under the supervision of the royal governess Charlotte Stierneld. Amalia left Sweden with her family upon her father's deposition after the Coup of 1809 and was raised in her mother's native country of Baden.

She was interested in music and was a friend of Jenny Lind. She was afflicted with rickets and died unmarried and childless in Oldenburg.

Ancestry

References 

1805 births
1853 deaths
Swedish princesses
Disinherited European royalty
House of Holstein-Gottorp
People from Stockholm
People from Baden
Daughters of kings
Burials at the Ducal Mausoleum, Gertrudenfriedhof (Oldenburg)
Royal reburials
Royalty and nobility with disabilities